Australia Pacific Airports Corporation Limited (APAC) is an unlisted company and owner of two Australian airports: Melbourne Airport and Launceston Airport. Each airport is operated by an airport lessee company, in which APAC has a controlling interest: Australia Pacific Airports (Melbourne) Pty Ltd and Australia Pacific Airports (Launceston) Pty Ltd respectively.

APAC acquired the lease for Melbourne Airport for $1.307 billion on 2 July 1997, and a 90% stake in Launceston Airport for $18.8 million on 29 May 1998. Launceston City Council owns the remaining 10% of Launceston Airport. Each airport is under a fifty year long-term lease from the Australian Government, with options for a further forty-nine years.

The company is majority Australian owned by five Australian fund managers:

AMP Capital (27.32%)
Industry Funds Management (IFM Investors) (25.17%)
SAS Trustee Corporation (Managed by NSW Treasury Corporation)(18.47%)
Future Fund (20.34%)
Utilities of Australia (Managed by HRL Morrison & Co) (8.70%)

The Chief Executive Officer is Lorie Argus.

References

External links
 The Australia Pacific Airports Corporation website

Airport operators
Companies based in Melbourne
Deutsche Bank
1997 establishments in Australia